

Infantry
1st New Jersey Volunteer Infantry Regiment
2nd New Jersey Volunteer Infantry Regiment
3rd New Jersey Volunteer Infantry Regiment
4th New Jersey Volunteer Infantry Regiment
5th New Jersey Volunteer Infantry Regiment
6th New Jersey Volunteer Infantry Regiment
7th New Jersey Volunteer Infantry Regiment
8th New Jersey Volunteer Infantry Regiment
9th New Jersey Volunteer Infantry Regiment
10th New Jersey Volunteer Infantry Regiment
11th New Jersey Volunteer Infantry Regiment
12th New Jersey Volunteer Infantry Regiment
13th New Jersey Volunteer Infantry Regiment
14th New Jersey Volunteer Infantry Regiment
15th New Jersey Volunteer Infantry Regiment
16th New Jersey Volunteer Infantry Regiment
17th New Jersey Volunteer Infantry Regiment
18th New Jersey Volunteer Infantry Regiment
19th New Jersey Volunteer Infantry Regiment
20th New Jersey Volunteer Infantry Regiment
21st New Jersey Volunteer Infantry Regiment
22nd New Jersey Volunteer Infantry Regiment
23rd New Jersey Volunteer Infantry Regiment
24th New Jersey Volunteer Infantry Regiment
25th New Jersey Volunteer Infantry Regiment
26th New Jersey Volunteer Infantry Regiment
27th New Jersey Volunteer Infantry Regiment
28th New Jersey Volunteer Infantry Regiment
29th New Jersey Volunteer Infantry Regiment
30th New Jersey Volunteer Infantry Regiment
31st New Jersey Volunteer Infantry Regiment
32nd New Jersey Volunteer Infantry Regiment
33rd New Jersey Volunteer Infantry Regiment
34th New Jersey Volunteer Infantry Regiment
35th New Jersey Volunteer Infantry Regiment
36th New Jersey Volunteer Infantry Regiment
37th New Jersey Volunteer Infantry Regiment
38th New Jersey Volunteer Infantry Regiment
39th New Jersey Volunteer Infantry Regiment
40th New Jersey Volunteer Infantry Regiment

Cavalry
1st New Jersey Volunteer Cavalry Regiment
2nd New Jersey Volunteer Cavalry Regiment
3rd New Jersey Volunteer Cavalry Regiment

Artillery
Battery A, 1st New Jersey Light Artillery ("Hexamer's" Battery)
Battery B, 1st New Jersey Light Artillery 
Battery C, 1st New Jersey Light Artillery 
4th Battery "D" New Jersey Volunteer Light Artillery 
5th Battery "E" New Jersey Volunteer Light Artillery

Brigades
First New Jersey Brigade (1st, 2nd, 3rd, 4th, 10th, 15th, 23rd and 40th Infantry Regiments)
Second New Jersey Brigade  (5th, 6th, 7th and 8th NJ Inf Regts)

See also
 Lists of American Civil War Regiments by State

 
New Jersey
Civil War